The 2018–19 San Antonio Spurs season was the 52nd season in the history of the franchise, and was its 43rd in the National Basketball Association (NBA) and its 46th in the San Antonio area. The Spurs finished the season with a 48-34 record and earned the seventh seed in the Western Conference playoffs. The team broke an NBA record with its 22nd consecutive playoff appearance. In the first round of the playoffs, the Spurs lost to the Denver Nuggets in seven games. 
Since then, this season currently marks the last time the Spurs have made the playoffs.

Season synopsis

During the 2018 offseason, star forward Kawhi Leonard requested a trade. He and Danny Green were traded to the Toronto Raptors in exchange for DeMar DeRozan, Jakob Pöltl, and a 2019 protected first round pick on July 18, 2018. 

The 2018-19 season was the first season since the 2000–01 season in which point guard Tony Parker was not on the team. After 17 years with the Spurs, he signed with the Charlotte Hornets in the off-season. It was also the first season since the 2001–02 season without Manu Ginóbili, who retired from the NBA on August 27, 2018, officially ending what was the Spurs' "Big Three" era. The departures of Parker, Danny Green, and Kawhi Leonard, and the retirement of Ginóbili, left Patty Mills as the longest-tenured Spur on the roster. Mills and Marco Belinelli were the last remaining players on the team who had played for the Spurs' 2014 championship team.

On March 28, 2019, the Spurs retired Ginóbili's number 20 jersey.

Draft

Roster

<noinclude>

Standings

Division

Conference

Game log

Preseason 

|- style="background:#bfb;"
| 1
| September 30
| Miami
| 104–100
| Rudy Gay (13)
| Jakob Pöltl (10)
| Patty Mills (4)
| AT&T Center17,024
| 1–0
|- style="background:#bfb;"
| 2
| October 5
| Detroit
| 117–93
| Dejounte Murray (16)
| Dejounte Murray (11)
| DeRozan, Forbes (3)
| AT&T Center18,121
| 2–0
|- style="background:#fcc;"
| 3
| October 7
| Houston
| 93–108
| DeMar DeRozan (22)
| LaMarcus Aldridge (7)
| DeMar DeRozan (5)
| AT&T Center18,326
| 2–1
|- style="background:#fcc;"
| 4
| October 10
| @ Atlanta
| 127–130
| Rudy Gay (28)
| White, Gasol, Pöltl (6)
| Pau Gasol (10)
| McCamish Pavilion7,433
| 2–2
|- style="background:#bfb;"
| 5
| October 12
| @ Orlando
| 100–81
| DeMar DeRozan (20)
| LaMarcus Aldridge (15)
| Aldridge, Gasol, Mills (4)
| Amway Center16,424
| 3–2

Regular season 

|- bgcolor=ccffcc
| 1
| October 17
| Minnesota
| 
| DeMar DeRozan (28)
| LaMarcus Aldridge (19)
| Pau Gasol (6)
| AT&T Center18,354
| 1–0
|- bgcolor=ffcccc
| 2
| October 20
| @ Portland
| 
| DeMar DeRozan (28)
| LaMarcus Aldridge (8)
| DeMar DeRozan (9)
| Moda Center19,461
| 1–1
|- bgcolor=ccffcc
| 3
| October 22
| @ L.A. Lakers
| 
| LaMarcus Aldridge (37)
| Dante Cunningham (12)
| DeMar DeRozan (14)
| Staples Center18,997
| 2–1
|- bgcolor=ffcccc
| 4
| October 24
| Indiana
| 
| DeMar DeRozan (18)
| LaMarcus Aldridge (13)
| DeRozan, Forbes (4)
| AT&T Center18,354
| 2–2
|- bgcolor=ccffcc
| 5
| October 27
| L.A. Lakers
| 
| DeMar DeRozan (30)
| DeRozan, Gay (12)
| DeMar DeRozan (8)
| AT&T Center18,589
| 3–2
|- bgcolor=ccffcc
| 6
| October 29
| Dallas
| 
| DeMar DeRozan (34)
| Rudy Gay (11)
| DeMar DeRozan (9)
| AT&T Center18,354
| 4–2
|- bgcolor=ccffcc
| 7
| October 31
| @ Phoenix
| 
| DeMar DeRozan (25)
| Rudy Gay (8)
| Bryn Forbes (7)
| Talking Stick Resort Arena12,328
| 5–2

|- bgcolor=ccffcc
| 8
| November 3
| New Orleans
| 
| DeMar DeRozan (26)
| LaMarcus Aldridge (12)
| LaMarcus Aldridge (6)
| AT&T Center18,354
| 6–2
|- bgcolor=ffcccc
| 9
| November 4
| Orlando
| 
| DeMar DeRozan (25)
| Pau Gasol (8)
| DeRozan, Gasol (5)
| AT&T Center18,354
| 6–3
|- bgcolor=ffcccc
| 10
| November 7
| @ Miami
| 
| Patty Mills (20)
| LaMarcus Aldridge (16)
| DeMar DeRozan (8)
| American Airlines Arena19,600
| 6–4
|- bgcolor=ccffcc
| 11
| November 10
| Houston
| 
| LaMarcus Aldridge (27)
| DeMar DeRozan (11)
| Derrick White (8)
| AT&T Center18,354
| 7–4
|-bgcolor=ffcccc
| 12
| November 12
| @ Sacramento
| 
| DeMar DeRozan (23)
| LaMarcus Aldridge (18)
| DeMar DeRozan (8)
| Golden 1 Center15,500
| 7–5
|-bgcolor=ffcccc
| 13
| November 14
| @ Phoenix
| 
| DeMar DeRozan (24)
| LaMarcus Aldridge (12)
| DeMar DeRozan (4)
| Talking Stick Resort Arena14,532
| 7–6
|-bgcolor=ffcccc
| 14
| November 15
| @ L.A. Clippers
| 
| DeMar DeRozan (34)
| LaMarcus Aldridge (16)
| DeRozan, Mills (5)
| Staples Center17,463
| 7–7
|-bgcolor=ccffcc
| 15
| November 18
| Golden State
| 
| LaMarcus Aldridge (24)
| LaMarcus Aldridge (18)
| DeMar DeRozan (9)
| AT&T Center18,354
| 8–7
|-bgcolor=ffcccc
| 16
| November 19
| @ New Orleans
| 
| DeMar DeRozan (21)
| LaMarcus Aldridge (10)
| DeMar DeRozan (5)
| Smoothie King Center14,675
| 8–8
|-bgcolor=ffcccc
| 17
| November 21
| Memphis
| 
| DeMar DeRozan (24)
| LaMarcus Aldridge (11)
| DeMar DeRozan (5)
| AT&T Center18,354
| 8–9
|-bgcolor=ccffcc
| 18
| November 23
| @ Indiana
| 
| LaMarcus Aldridge (33)
| LaMarcus Aldridge (14)
| Rudy Gay (7)
| Bankers Life Fieldhouse17,262
| 9–9
|-bgcolor=ffcccc
| 19
| November 24
| @ Milwaukee
| 
| DeMar DeRozan (34)
| Dante Cunningham (10)
| DeMar DeRozan (7)
| Fiserv Forum17,559
| 9–10
|-bgcolor=ccffcc
| 20
| November 26
| @ Chicago
| 
| DeMar DeRozan (21)
| DeRozan, Aldridge (8)
| Bryn Forbes (6)
| United Center19,006
| 10–10
|-bgcolor=ffcccc
| 21
| November 28
| @ Minnesota
| 
| Jakob Poeltl (14)
| LaMarcus Aldridge (9)
| Gay, White (4)
| Target Center11,023
| 10–11
|-bgcolor=ffcccc
| 22
| November 30
| Houston
| 
| LaMarcus Aldridge (20)
| Rudy Gay (8)
| Derrick White (9)
| AT&T Center18,354
| 10–12

|- bgcolor=ccffcc
| 23
| December 2
| Portland
| 
| DeMar DeRozan (36)
| DeRozan, Aldridge (8)
| DeRozan, Mills, White (6)
| AT&T Center18,354
| 11–12
|- bgcolor=ffcccc
| 24
| December 4
| @ Utah
| 
| Jakob Poeltl (20)
| Jakob Poeltl (7)
| DeMar DeRozan (7)
| Vivint Smart Home Arena18,306
| 11–13
|- bgcolor=ffcccc
| 25
| December 5
| @ L.A. Lakers
| 
| DeMar DeRozan (32)
| LaMarcus Aldridge (9)
| Derrick White (5)
| Staples Center18,997
| 11–14
|-bgcolor=ccffcc
| 26
| December 7
| L.A. Lakers
| 
| DeMar DeRozan (36)
| DeRozan, Aldridge, Poeltl (8)
| DeMar DeRozan (9)
| AT&T Center18,354
| 12–14
|- bgcolor=ccffcc
| 27
| December 9
| Utah
| 
| DeMar DeRozan (26)
| Rudy Gay (15)
| DeMar DeRozan (8)
| AT&T Center17,834
| 13–14
|- bgcolor=ccffcc
| 28
| December 11
| Phoenix
| 
| Bryn Forbes (24)
| Forbes, Poeltl (11)
| DeMar DeRozan (9)
| AT&T Center17,676
| 14–14
|- bgcolor=ccffcc
| 29
| December 13
| L.A. Clippers
| 
| LaMarcus Aldridge (27)
| Gay, Poeltl, Cunningham (6)
| DeMar DeRozan (7)
| AT&T Center18,354
| 15–14
|- bgcolor=ffcccc
| 30
| December 15
| Chicago
| 
| LaMarcus Aldridge (29)
| LaMarcus Aldridge (12)
| Patty Mills (4)
| AT&T Center18,354
| 15–15
|- bgcolor=ccffcc
| 31
| December 17
| Philadelphia
| 
| Rudy Gay (21)
| LaMarcus Aldridge (10)
| DeMar DeRozan (7)
| AT&T Center17,486
| 16–15
|- bgcolor=ccffcc
| 32
| December 19
| @ Orlando
| 
| LaMarcus Aldridge (20)
| DeMar DeRozan (7)
| DeMar DeRozan (6)
| Amway Center17,138
| 17–15
|- bgcolor=ccffcc
| 33
| December 21
| Minnesota
| 
| Bryn Forbes (22)
| LaMarcus Aldridge (9)
| DeMar DeRozan (8)
| AT&T Center17,708
| 18–15
|- bgcolor=ffcccc
| 34
| December 22
| @ Houston
| 
| DeMar DeRozan (28)
| Rudy Gay (8)
| DeMar DeRozan (8)
| Toyota Center18,055
| 18–16
|- bgcolor=ccffcc
| 35
| December 26
| Denver
| 
| DeMar DeRozan (30)
| Jakob Poeltl (11)
| DeRozan, Belinelli (5)
| AT&T Center18,408
| 19–16
|- bgcolor=ffcccc
| 36
| December 28
| @ Denver
| 
| DeMar DeRozan (24)
| LaMarcus Aldridge (7)
| DeMar DeRozan (5)
| Pepsi Center20,076
| 19–17
|- bgcolor=ccffcc
| 37
| December 29
| @ L.A. Clippers
| 
| LaMarcus Aldridge (38)
| DeMar DeRozan (13)
| Bryn Forbes (7)
| Staples Center19,068
| 20–17
|- bgcolor=ccffcc
| 38
| December 31
| Boston
| 
| LaMarcus Aldridge (32)
| LaMarcus Aldridge (9)
| DeMar DeRozan (10)
| AT&T Center18,354
| 21–17

|- bgcolor=ccffcc
| 39
| January 3
| Toronto
| 
| LaMarcus Aldridge (23)
| DeMar DeRozan (14)
| DeMar DeRozan (11)
| AT&T Center18,354
| 22–17
|- bgcolor=ccffcc
| 40
| January 5
| Memphis
| 
| Derrick White (19)
| DeMar DeRozan (9)
| LaMarcus Aldridge (7)
| AT&T Center18,354
| 23–17
|- bgcolor=ccffcc
| 41
| January 7
| @ Detroit
| 
| DeMar DeRozan (26)
| DeMar DeRozan (7)
| DeMar DeRozan (9)
| Little Caesars Arena13,107
| 24–17
|- bgcolor=ffcccc
| 42
| January 9
| @ Memphis
| 
| Forbes, Belinelli (14)
| Pau Gasol (12)
| DeMar DeRozan (4)
| FedExForum13,944
| 24–18
|- bgcolor=ccffcc
| 43
| January 10
| Oklahoma City
| 
| LaMarcus Aldridge (56)
| LaMarcus Aldridge (9)
| DeMar DeRozan (11)
| AT&T Center18,354
| 25–18
|- bgcolor=ffcccc
| 44
| January 12
| @ Oklahoma City
| 
| Marco Belinelli (24)
| Jakob Poeltl (10)
| DeRozan, Mills, White (4)
| Chesapeake Energy Arena18,203
| 25–19
|- bgcolor=ffcccc
| 45
| January 14
| Charlotte
| 
| LaMarcus Aldridge (28)
| LaMarcus Aldridge (10)
| Derrick White (7)
| AT&T Center18,354
| 25–20
|- bgcolor=ccffcc
| 46
| January 16
| @ Dallas
| 
| Marco Belinelli (17)
| Jakob Poeltl (7)
| DeMar DeRozan (9)
| American Airlines Center20,214
| 26–20
|- bgcolor=ccffcc
| 47
| January 18
| @ Minnesota
| 
| LaMarcus Aldridge (25)
| LaMarcus Aldridge (9)
| Patty Mills (8)
| Target Center17,222
| 27–20
|- bgcolor=ffcccc
| 48
| January 20
| L.A. Clippers
| 
| LaMarcus Aldridge (30)
| LaMarcus Aldridge (14)
| Derrick White (4)
| AT&T Center18,354
| 27–21
|- bgcolor=ffcccc
| 49
| January 23
| @ Philadelphia
| 
| DeMar DeRozan (26)
| DeMar DeRozan (9)
| LaMarcus Aldridge (6)
| Wells Fargo Center20,339
| 27–22
|- bgcolor=ccffcc
| 50
| January 26
| @ New Orleans
| 
| LaMarcus Aldridge (28)
| LaMarcus Aldridge (12)
| Patty Mills (5)
| Smoothie King Center17,724
| 28–22
|- bgcolor=ccffcc
| 51
| January 27
| Washington
| 
| LaMarcus Aldridge (30)
| LaMarcus Aldridge (9)
| Patty Mills (7)
| AT&T Center18,354
| 29–22
|- bgcolor=ccffcc
| 52
| January 29
| Phoenix
| 
| LaMarcus Aldridge (30)
| LaMarcus Aldridge (9)
| Belinelli, Gay, Mills, Bertans (5)
| AT&T Center18,121
| 30–22
|- bgcolor=ccffcc
| 53
| January 31
| Brooklyn
| 
| Derrick White (26)
| LaMarcus Aldridge (13)
| Derrick White (6)
| AT&T Center18,057
| 31–22

|- bgcolor=ccffcc
| 54
| February 2
| New Orleans
| 
| LaMarcus Aldridge (25)
| LaMarcus Aldridge (14)
| DeMar DeRozan (5)
| AT&T Center18,354
| 32–22
|- bgcolor=ffcccc
| 55
| February 4
| @ Sacramento
| 
| DeMar DeRozan (24)
| LaMarcus Aldridge (9)
| Belinelli, DeRozan (4)
| Golden 1 Center16,245
| 32–23
|- bgcolor=ffcccc
| 56
| February 6
| @ Golden State
| 
| Patty Mills (16)
| Cunningham, Metu (5)
| Jakob Poeltl (6)
| Oracle Arena19,596
| 32–24
|- bgcolor=ffcccc
| 57
| February 7
| @ Portland
| 
| DeMar DeRozan (35)
| LaMarcus Aldridge (10)
| Patty Mills (8)
| Moda Center19,393
| 32–25
|- bgcolor=ffcccc
| 58
| February 9
| @ Utah
| 
| DeMar DeRozan (23)
| LaMarcus Aldridge (10)
| Mills, DeRozan (4)
| Vivint Smart Home Arena18,306
| 32–26
|- bgcolor=ccffcc
| 59
| February 12
| @ Memphis
| 
| Aldridge, Mills (22)
| Rudy Gay (12)
| Rudy Gay (8)
| FedExForum13,788
| 33–26
|- bgcolor=ffcccc
| 60
| February 22
| @ Toronto
| 
| DeMar DeRozan (23)
| Rudy Gay (10)
| DeMar DeRozan (8)
| Scotiabank Arena20,058
| 33–27
|- bgcolor=ffcccc
| 61
| February 24
| @ N. Y. Knicks
| 
| DeMar DeRozan (32)
| Poeltl, DeRozan (9)
| Mills, DeRozan (4)
| Madison Square Garden18,019
| 33–28
|- bgcolor=ffcccc
| 62
| February 25
| @ Brooklyn
| 
| LaMarcus Aldridge (26)
| LaMarcus Aldridge (10)
| Derrick White (4)
| Barclays Center13,479
| 33–29
|- bgcolor=ccffcc
| 63
| February 27
| Detroit
| 
| LaMarcus Aldridge (24)
| Jakob Poeltl (14)
| DeMar DeRozan (8)
| AT&T Center18,354
| 34–29

|- bgcolor=ccffcc
| 64
| March 2
| Oklahoma City
| 
| LaMarcus Aldridge (27)
| LaMarcus Aldridge (10)
| DeMar DeRozan (7)
| AT&T Center18,354
| 35–29
|- bgcolor=ccffcc
| 65
| March 4
| Denver
| 
| DeMar DeRozan (24)
| LaMarcus Aldridge (9)
| Derrick White (9)
| AT&T Center18,354
| 36–29
|- bgcolor=ccffcc
| 66
| March 6
| @ Atlanta
| 
| LaMarcus Aldridge (32)
| Rudy Gay (11)
| Derrick White (9)
| State Farm Arena15,208
| 37–29
|- bgcolor=ccffcc
| 67
| March 10
| Milwaukee
| 
| LaMarcus Aldridge (29)
| LaMarcus Aldridge (16)
| DeMar DeRozan (6)
| AT&T Center18,594
| 38–29
|- bgcolor=ccffcc
| 68
| March 12
| @ Dallas
| 
| DeMar DeRozan (33)
| Aldridge, Poeltl (7)
| Derrick White (7)
| American Airlines Center20,366
| 39–29
|- bgcolor=ccffcc
| 69
| March 15
| N. Y. Knicks
| 
| LaMarcus Aldridge (18)
| LaMarcus Aldridge (11)
| White, DeRozan (7)
| AT&T Center18,354
| 40–29
|- bgcolor=ccffcc
| 70
| March 16
| Portland
| 
| DeMar DeRozan (21)
| DeRozan, Aldridge (8)
| Patty Mills (4)
| AT&T Center18,354
| 41–29
|- bgcolor=ccffcc
| 71
| March 18
| Golden State
| 
| DeMar DeRozan (26)
| LaMarcus Aldridge (13)
| DeMar DeRozan (8)
| AT&T Center18,354
| 42–29
|- bgcolor=ffcccc
| 72
| March 20
| Miami
| 
| Belinelli, Mills, Aldridge (17)
| DeMar DeRozan (16)
| DeRozan, Mills (6)
| AT&T Center18,354
| 42–30
|- bgcolor=ffcccc
| 73
| March 22
| @ Houston
| 
| Davis Bertans (20)
| Rudy Gay (9)
| DeMar DeRozan (8)
| Toyota Center18,055
| 42–31
|- bgcolor=ccffcc
| 74
| March 24
| @ Boston
| 
| LaMarcus Aldridge (48)
| LaMarcus Aldridge (13)
| DeMar DeRozan (11)
| TD Garden18,624
| 43–31
|- bgcolor=ffcccc
| 75
| March 26
| @ Charlotte
| 
| DeMar DeRozan (30)
| LaMarcus Aldridge (15)
| Derrick White (7)
| Spectrum Center14,227
| 43–32
|- bgcolor=ccffcc
| 76
| March 28
| Cleveland
| 
| DeMar DeRozan (25)
| Rudy Gay (8)
| DeMar DeRozan (8)
| AT&T Center18,756
| 44–32
|- bgcolor=ffcccc
| 77
| March 31
| Sacramento
| 
| LaMarcus Aldridge (27)
| LaMarcus Aldridge (18)
| DeMar DeRozan (7)
| AT&T Center18,581
| 44–33

|- bgcolor=ccffcc
| 78
| April 2
| Atlanta
| 
| DeMar DeRozan (29)
| Gay, Aldridge (11)
| DeMar DeRozan (7)
| AT&T Center18,354
| 45–33
|- bgcolor=ffcccc
| 79
| April 3
| @ Denver
| 
| Aldridge, Walker (16)
| Rudy Gay (8)
| Forbes, DeRozan (3)
| Pepsi Center17,643
| 45–34
|- bgcolor=ccffcc
| 80
| April 5
| @ Washington
| 
| LaMarcus Aldridge 24)
| Aldridge, Poeltl (7)
| Derrick White (8)
| Capital One Arena20,409
| 46–34
|- bgcolor=ccffcc
| 81
| April 7
| @ Cleveland
| 
| LaMarcus Aldridge (18)
| LaMarcus Aldridge (13)
| DeMar DeRozan (9)
| Quicken Loans Arena19,432
| 47–34
|- bgcolor=ccffcc
| 82
| April 10
| Dallas
| 
| LaMarcus Aldridge (34)
| LaMarcus Aldridge (16)
| Patty Mills (5)
| AT&T Center18,581
| 48–34

Playoffs

Game log

|- bgcolor=ccffcc
| 1
| April 13
| @ Denver
| 
| DeMar DeRozan (18)
| DeMar DeRozan (12)
| DeMar DeRozan (6)
| Pepsi Center19,520
| 1–0
|- bgcolor=ffcccc
| 2
| April 16
| @ Denver
| 
| DeMar DeRozan (31)
| Rudy Gay (9)
| Patty Mills (5)
| Pepsi Center19,520
| 1–1
|- bgcolor=ccffcc
| 3
| April 18
| Denver
| 
| Derrick White (36)
| Aldridge, Gay (11)
| Aldridge, DeRozan, White (5)
| AT&T Center18,354
| 2–1
|- bgcolor=ffcccc
| 4
| April 20
| Denver
| 
| LaMarcus Aldridge (24)
| Aldridge, Pöltl (9)
| DeRozan, White (5)
| AT&T Center18,354
| 2–2
|- bgcolor=ffcccc
| 5
| April 23
| @ Denver
| 
| Aldridge, DeRozan (17)
| LaMarcus Aldridge (10)
| Jakob Pöltl (4)
| Pepsi Center19,520
| 2–3
|- bgcolor=ccffcc
| 6
| April 25
| Denver
| 
| LaMarcus Aldridge (26)
| LaMarcus Aldridge (10)
| DeMar DeRozan (7)
| AT&T Center18,354
| 3–3
|- bgcolor=ffcccc
| 7
| April 27
| @ Denver
| 
| Rudy Gay (21)
| LaMarcus Aldridge (11)
| DeMar DeRozan (6)
| Pepsi Center19,725
| 3–4

Player statistics

Regular season

|-
| align="left"| || align="center"| C
| 81 || style=";"|81 || 2,687 || style=";"|744 || 194 || 43 || style=";"|107 || style=";"|1,727
|-
| align="left"| || align="center"| SG
| 79 || 1 || 1,815 || 198 || 132 || 35 || 8 || 829
|-
| align="left"| || align="center"| PF
| 76 || 12 || 1,632 || 264 || 100 || 35 || 33 || 606
|-
| align="left"| || align="center"| PF
| 64 || 21 || 928 || 188 || 50 || 27 || 13 || 194
|-
| align="left"| || align="center"| SG
| 77 || 77 || style=";"|2,688 || 462 || style=";"|475 || style=";"|86 || 36 || 1,635
|-
| align="left"| || align="center"| PF
| 23 || 0 || 113 || 34 || 7 || 2 || 5 || 41
|-
| align="left"| || align="center"| SG
| style=";"|82 || style=";"|81 || 2,293 || 239 || 175 || 45 || 4 || 967
|-
| align="left"|‡ || align="center"| C
| 27 || 6 || 330 || 127 || 50 || 5 || 14 || 114
|-
| align="left"| || align="center"| PF
| 69 || 51 || 1,842 || 470 || 182 || 54 || 34 || 946
|-
| align="left"| || align="center"| PF
| 29 || 0 || 145 || 36 || 13 || 6 || 2 || 51
|-
| align="left"| || align="center"| PG
| style=";"|82 || 1 || 1,908 || 182 || 245 || 49 || 10 || 811
|-
| align="left"| || align="center"| PF
| 3 || 0 || 13 || 3 || 1 || 0 || 1 || 6
|-
| align="left"| || align="center"| C
| 77 || 24 || 1,273 || 410 || 93 || 29 || 68 || 423
|-
| align="left"| || align="center"| SF
| 53 || 0 || 292 || 46 || 24 || 11 || 1 || 98
|-
| align="left"| || align="center"| SG
| 17 || 0 || 118 || 17 || 9 || 7 || 3 || 45
|-
| align="left"| || align="center"| PG
| 67 || 55 || 1,728 || 247 || 263 || 67 || 47 || 663
|}
After all games.
‡Waived during the season
†Traded during the season
≠Acquired during the season

Playoffs

|-
| align="left"| || align="center"| C
| style=";"|7 || style=";"|7 || 244 || style=";"|67 || 19 || 5 || style=";"|7 || 140
|-
| align="left"| || align="center"| SG
| style=";"|7 || 0 || 131 || 13 || 8 || 0 || 2 || 41
|-
| align="left"| || align="center"| PF
| 5 || 0 || 79 || 8 || 5 || 0 || 1 || 16
|-
| align="left"| || align="center"| PF
| 5 || 0 || 13 || 6 || 0 || 0 || 0 || 6
|-
| align="left"| || align="center"| SG
| style=";"|7 || style=";"|7 || style=";"|251 || 47 || style=";"|32 || style=";"|8 || 1 || style=";"|154
|-
| align="left"| || align="center"| SG
| style=";"|7 || style=";"|7 || 212 || 25 || 7 || 1 || 1 || 75
|-
| align="left"| || align="center"| PF
| style=";"|7 || 0 || 179 || 50 || 12 || 3 || 5 || 78
|-
| align="left"| || align="center"| PG
| style=";"|7 || 0 || 152 || 15 || 25 || 7 || 1 || 37
|-
| align="left"| || align="center"| PF
| 5 || 0 || 19 || 7 || 2 || 0 || 0 || 13
|-
| align="left"| || align="center"| C
| style=";"|7 || style=";"|7 || 177 || 54 || 12 || 2 || 5 || 51
|-
| align="left"| || align="center"| SF
| 5 || 0 || 12 || 1 || 2 || 1 || 0 || 0
|-
| align="left"| || align="center"| SG
| 6 || 0 || 21 || 2 || 3 || 0 || 0 || 6
|-
| align="left"| || align="center"| PG
| style=";"|7 || style=";"|7 || 191 || 21 || 21 || 5 || 5 || 106
|}

Transactions

Trades

Free agency

Re-signed

Additions

Subtractions

References

San Antonio Spurs seasons
San Antonio Spurs
San Antonio Spurs
San Antonio Spurs